Baishilong station is a station on Line 4 of the Shenzhen Metro. It opened on 16 June 2011

Station layout

Exits

References

External links
 Shenzhen Metro Luohu Station (Chinese)
 Shenzhen Metro Luohu Station (English)

Railway stations in Guangdong
Shenzhen Metro stations
Longhua District, Shenzhen
Railway stations in China opened in 2011